Elisabeth Hamilton Friermood (December 30, 1903  March 25, 1992) was an American storyteller, librarian, and author of historical fiction for young adult readers. 

Friermood ( Elisabeth Hamilton) was born in Marion, Indiana, to parents Burr Hamilton (a firefighter) and Etta Hale Hamilton. In 1928, she married Harold T. Friermood, author of The YMCA Guide to Adult Fitness. She and her husband collaborated on an autobiography, Frier and Elisabeth, which was published in 1979. 

Friermood's experience as a children's librarian (in the Marion Public Library and the Dayton Public Library) inspired several of her characters. Her historical fiction was extremely well researched, and included books set in the Midwest in the 1800s describing pioneer life, the Spanish American war, the Underground Railroad, and two books about the Wabash River. She also contributed articles and stories to Horn Book Magazine, Story Parade and Seashore Press publications. Her works were published by Doubleday.

Selected works 
The Wabash Knows the Secret (1951)
Geneva Summer: A Romance of College Camp (1952) 
Hoosier heritage (1954) 
Candle in the Sun (1955)
That Jones Girl (1956) 
 Jo Allen's Predicament (1959) 
 Head High, Ellen Brody (1958) (nominated for the Sequoyah Book Award in 1960) 
 Promises in the Attic (1960) 
The luck of Daphne Tolliver (1961) 
 Ballad of Calamity Creek (1962)
The wild Donahues (1963)
Whispering Willows (1964)
 Doc Dudley's Daughter (1965) 
Molly's Double Rainbow (1966)
 Circus Sequins (1968) 
Focus the bright land (awarded the Ohioana Book Award for Children's Literature in 1968) 
Peppers' Paradise (1969) 
 One of Fred's Girls (1970) 
 Frier and Elisabeth, sportsman and storyteller (1979) (published by Vantage Press)

References 

 Elisabeth Hamilton Friermood at LibraryThing
 Elisabeth Hamilton Friermood, WorldCat Identity
 Commire, Anne (1973). Something about the author. [electronic resource]. Internet Archive. Detroit, Mich. : Gale Research. .
 Fuller, Muriel (1977). More junior authors. Internet Archive. New York : Wilson. .
 A photo of Elisabeth Hamilton Friermood can be found in the Mountain Scholar Magazine

External links 

 https://www.lib.usm.edu/legacy/degrum/public_html/html/research/findaids/DG0352.html
 Elisabeth Hamilton Friermood at LibraryThing
 Elisabeth Hamilton Friermood, WorldCat Identity
 Elisabeth Hamilton Friermood papers, 1951-1964 at the University of Oregon
 Elisabeth Hamilton Friermood collection, 1898-1959 at the Indiana State Library

1903 births
1992 deaths
20th-century American writers
20th-century American women writers
American children's writers